Redbridge London Borough Council is the local authority for Redbridge in Greater London, England, and one of the capital's 32 borough councils. Redbridge is divided into 21 wards and elects 63 councillors. , Redbridge Council comprises 55 Labour Party members, 5 Conservative Party members and three seats are vacant. After alternating between Conservative administration and no overall control from its creation, the council has been run by the Labour Party since 2014.

The council was created by the London Government Act 1963 and replaced four local authorities: Ilford Borough Council and Wanstead and Woodford Borough Council, with parts from Chigwell Urban District Council and Dagenham Borough Council.

History

There have previously been a number of local authorities responsible for the Redbridge area. The current local authority was first elected in 1964, a year before formally coming into its powers and prior to the creation of the London Borough of Redbridge on 1 April 1965. Redbridge replaced Ilford Borough Council and Wanstead and Woodford Borough Council entirely, and replaced Chigwell Urban District Council in Hainault and Dagenham Borough Council in the Hog Hill area.

It was envisaged that through the London Government Act 1963 Redbridge as a London local authority would share power with the Greater London Council. The split of powers and functions meant that the Greater London Council was responsible for "wide area" services such as fire, ambulance, flood prevention, and refuse disposal; with the local authorities responsible for "personal" services such as social care, libraries, cemeteries and refuse collection. As an outer London borough council it has been an education authority since 1965. This arrangement lasted until 1986 when Redbridge London Borough Council gained responsibility for some services that had been provided by the Greater London Council, such as waste disposal. Since 2000 the Greater London Authority has taken some responsibility for highways and planning control from the council, but within the English local government system the council remains a "most purpose" authority in terms of the available range of powers and functions.

Powers and functions
The local authority derives its powers and functions from the London Government Act 1963 and subsequent legislation, and has the powers and functions of a London borough council. It sets council tax and as a billing authority also collects precepts for Greater London Authority functions and business rates. It sets planning policies which complement Greater London Authority and national policies, and decides on almost all planning applications accordingly.  It is a local education authority  and is also responsible for council housing, social services, libraries, waste collection and disposal, traffic, and most roads and environmental health.

Past Mayors and Deputy Mayors

The Redbridge Mayor is elected by the Council annually. The Mayor presides over meetings of the Council. The mayor or the Deputy Mayor will also attend civic and ceremonial functions.

Summary results of elections

Since 1964 political control of the council has been held by the following parties:

References

Local authorities in London
London borough councils
Politics of the London Borough of Redbridge
Leader and cabinet executives
Local education authorities in England
Billing authorities in England